The Saeb mausoleum is located in Isfahan, Iran. The mausoleum is the burial place of Saeb Tabrizi, the famous iranian poet of 17th century. His ancestry goes back to Shams Tabrizi, Rumi's spiritual instructor. Saeb's father was one of the famous merchants in Tabriz. When Isfahan became the capital city, he moved to Isfahan with his family. He tried for a long time to get the title of honor Malek osh-Shoara (Poet laureate) from the King Abbas I, but he was not successful and he immigrated to India. His mausoleum belongs to the Pahlavi era, but his gravestone has the date 1087(islamic calendar), which is equal to 1676(Gregorian calendar).

References 

Mausoleums in Isfahan